Nicholas Minue (March 13, 1905 – April 28, 1943) was a Ukrainian American and United States Army career veteran who received the Medal of Honor posthumously in World War II. Private Minue with fixed bayonet, singlehandedly assaulted and destroyed several enemy positions while under fire near Medjez El Bab, Tunisia, until he was fatally wounded.

Biography

Minue was born in Sedden, Kingdom of Galicia and Lodomeria to ethnic Ukrainian parents.

Military service
Minue enlisted in the United States Army in 1927, in Carteret, New Jersey. He held the rank sergeant when World War II began.

World War II
He wanted to serve overseas in a combat unit during World War II. To do so, he volunteered to give up his rank of sergeant for the lower rank of private. In December 1942, he was assigned to a rifle platoon of Company A, 1st Battalion, 6th Armored Infantry Regiment in 1942.

Death and burial
Pvt. Minue was killed in action while fighting soldiers of German Field Marshal Rommel's Afrika Korps on April 28, 1943. He was awarded the Medal of Honor for his heroic actions that day. He is buried in the North Africa American Cemetery and Memorial in Carthage, Tunisia. His grave can be found in Section E, Line 8. Grave 4.

Medal of Honor citation
Rank and organization: Private, U.S. Army, Company A, 6th Armored Infantry, 1st Armored Division. Place and date: Near MedjezelBab, Tunisia, April 28, 1943. Entered service at: Carteret, N.J. Birth: Sedden, Poland. G.O. No.: 24, March 25, 1944.

Citation:

For distinguishing himself conspicuously by gallantry and intrepidity at the loss of his life above and beyond the call of duty in action with the enemy on 28 April 1943, in the vicinity of MedjezelBab, Tunisia. When the advance of the assault elements of Company A was held up by flanking fire from an enemy machinegun nest, Pvt. Minue voluntarily, alone, and unhesitatingly, with complete disregard of his own welfare, charged the enemy entrenched position with fixed bayonet. Pvt. Minue assaulted the enemy under a withering machinegun and rifle fire, killing approximately 10 enemy machinegunners and riflemen. After completely destroying this position, Pvt. Minue continued forward, routing enemy riflemen from dugout positions until he was fatally wounded. The courage, fearlessness and aggressiveness displayed by Pvt. Minue in the face of inevitable death was unquestionably the factor that gave his company the offensive spirit that was necessary for advancing and driving the enemy from the entire sector.

Personal honors

Some of Pvt. Minue's personal honors:

In early 1956, the U.S. Army christened two new 172 foot, 860 ton, passenger and vehicle ferries which were named after two Medal of Honor recipients from the region, the Lt. Samuel S. Coursen and the Private Nicholas Minue. Both boats operated in New York Harbor between Manhattan and the US Army post and US Army headquarters at Fort Jay, Governors Island. Both boats continued in service when Governors Island became a U.S. Coast Guard base in 1966. In 1996, the Minue was declared excess as the Coast Guard closed the base. Sold to a maritime speculator, it is now in decrepit condition in dock in Staten Island New York. This ferryboat appeared in the TV murder mystery More Than Murder.
Private Nicholas Minue Elementary School, Carteret, New Jersey.
One of the main roads on Contingency Operating Base Speicher, in Tikrit, Iraq, is named in his honor.
Minue Drive, East Fort Bliss, Texas.
Minue Road, Fort Hood, Texas.
Pvt. Nicholas Minue UAV Post 7, New York City, New York.
Pvt. Nicholas Minue VFW Star Landing Post 2314, Carteret, New Jersey

See also

List of Medal of Honor recipients for World War II

References

 

1905 births
1943 deaths
People from the Kingdom of Galicia and Lodomeria
Ukrainian Austro-Hungarians
United States Army soldiers
United States Army Medal of Honor recipients
United States Army personnel killed in World War II
People from Carteret, New Jersey
Polish emigrants to the United States
Foreign-born Medal of Honor recipients
World War II recipients of the Medal of Honor